Octanoyl-(GcvH):protein N-octanoyltransferase (LIPL, octanoyl-[GcvH]:E2 amidotransferase, YWFL (gene)) is an enzyme with systematic name (glycine cleavage system H)-N6-octanoyl-L-lysine:(lipoyl-carrier protein)-N6-L-lysine octanoyltransferase. This enzyme catalyses the following chemical reaction

 [glycine cleavage system H]-N6-octanoyl-L-lysine + [lipoyl-carrier protein]  glycine cleavage system H + [lipoyl-carrier protein]-N6-octanoyl-L-lysine

This enzyme is purified from the bacterium Bacillus subtilis.

References

External links 
 

EC 2.3.1